Tera 100 is a supercomputer built by Bull SA for the French Commissariat à l'Énergie Atomique.

On May 26, 2010, Tera 100 was turned on. The computer, which is located in Essonne is able to sustain around 1 petaFLOPs maximum performance and a peak at 1.25 petaFLOPs. It has 4300 Bullx Series S servers ('Mesca'), 140,000 Intel Xeon 7500 processor cores, and 300 TB of memory. The Interconnect is QDR InfiniBand. The file system has a throughput of 500 GB/s and total storage of 20 PB. It uses the SLURM resource manager for scheduling batch jobs.

Tera 100 uses Bull XBAS Linux, a partly Red Hat Enterprise Linux derivative.

In June 2011, TOP500 deemed it the ninth fastest supercomputer in the world, and in 2020, it had dropped off the list.

See also
 Computer science
 Computing
 Tera-10

References

External links
CEA HPC site

Petascale computers
Supercomputing in Europe
X86 supercomputers